Mária Mohácsik (born 28 November 1990 in Budapest) is a former Hungarian handballer.

Achievements
Nemzeti Bajnokság I:
Silver Medallist: 2009
Bronze Medallist: 2011
Magyar Kupa:
Silver Medallist: 2010
EHF Cup Winners' Cup:
Winner: 2011

References

External links
 Mária Mohácsik career statistics on Worldhandball.com

1990 births
Living people
Handball players from Budapest
Hungarian female handball players
20th-century Hungarian women
21st-century Hungarian women